Farmersville Unified School District is a public school district in Tulare County, California, United States.

References

External links
 

School districts in Tulare County, California